Viktor Zsuffka (9 July 1910 – 20 June 2001) was a Hungarian athlete. He competed in the men's pole vault at the 1936 Summer Olympics.

References

External links
 

1910 births
2001 deaths
Athletes (track and field) at the 1936 Summer Olympics
Hungarian male pole vaulters
Olympic athletes of Hungary